Corofin or Corrofin is a village and parish in County Galway, Ireland, situated on the N17 road between Galway City and Tuam.

History
Corrofin Castle is a mid-15th century tower house, now partly in ruins.

Sport
The local Gaelic football club, Corofin, have won five All-Ireland Senior Club Football Championships, most recently beating Kilcoo in the 2019-2020 Championship final. They also hold the record for most successive All-Ireland Club Championship titles, winning three-in-a-row between 2017 and 2020. Their team of the 2010s is the most successful, winning the county title seven times, the Connacht Senior Football Championship four times and the All-Ireland Senior Club Championship five times.

Corofin has an athletics team named Corofin AC and a football team named Corofin United.

A Corofin native, Bishop Patrick Duggan of Clonfert, declined the honour of being the first patron of the GAA, giving the honour to the younger man, Archbishop Thomas Croke of Cashel.

See also
 List of towns and villages in Ireland

References

Towns and villages in County Galway
Civil parishes of County Galway